The following highways are numbered 18E:

United States
 Nebraska Spur 18E
 New York State Route 18E (former)

See also
List of highways numbered 18